Pakistan–United Kingdom relations refer to the bilateral ties between the Islamic Republic of Pakistan and the United Kingdom of Great Britain and Northern Ireland. Both countries are members of the Commonwealth of Nations, and the United Kingdom is home to a large Pakistani diaspora population. Until 1956, Pakistan was nominally part of the British Empire as a post-independence federal dominion in the aftermath of the partition of British India in 1947.

History 
Formerly part of the British Empire, Pakistan became independent from the UK in 1947 under the terms of the Indian Independence Act. At this point the Dominion of Pakistan was still nominally part of the British Empire, until it became a separate Republic in 1956.

Pakistan left the Commonwealth of Nations in 1972 in protest of the recognition of Bangladeshi independence, before rejoining in 1989.

In 2018, Pakistan and the United Kingdom signed the UK-Pakistan Prisoner Transfer Agreement allowing foreign prisoners in both countries to serve their sentences in home country.

Diplomatic relations 

The United Kingdom and Pakistan have High Commissioners, a position which often fulfills the role ambassador within the Commonwealth, in the other country. The current High Commissioner for the UK in Pakistan is Christian Turner, and Pakistan's High Commissioner to the UK is currently Mohammad Nafees Zakaria.

Economic relations 
Since 1988 there has been a tax treaty in place between the two countries designed to prevent individuals or businesses being taxed for the same income twice, and to prevent tax avoidance.

In 2012 the Prime Ministers of both countries launched a Trade and Investment Roadmap to increase trade between the countries. Chaudhry Nisar Ali Khan, Pakistani Interior Minister, recently stated bilateral visits between the countries would be arranged to support trade relations.

A Pakistan–Britain Advisory Council was setup in 2002 to look at how the two governments could facilitate trade and commercial connections between the two countries.

Military relations
Both nations were part of a Cold War alliance called the Central Treaty Organization, which the UK saw as important in containing the expansion of Soviet influence in the region, while Pakistan joined partly in the hope of attracting economic benefits from the West. Pakistan's intelligence agency the ISI was formed by British officers in their departure from India, the ISI maintains extensive links with UK intelligence services and operations inside the UK. The British government regards the Baluchistan Liberation Army as a terrorist organization, it was proscribed in July 2006. Regular meetings and discussions on national security and counter-terrorism regularly take place between the governments of the two countries. Owing to their support for UK populations and local forces, settled British Pakistanis are more likely to feel that Pakistan should spend less on military and pay national debt instead. A large number of settled Pakistanis support the UK left wing including anti-war groups which propose selling all nuclear weapons.

See also
 British Pakistanis
 High Commission of Pakistan, London
 Inter-Services Intelligence activities in the United Kingdom

References

External links 

 British High Commission Islamabad
 High Commission for Pakistan London

 
United Kingdom 
Bilateral relations of the United Kingdom
Relations of colonizer and former colony